Chakwalian (Urdu: چکوالیاں) is a village, union council, and administrative subdivision of Chakwal District in the Punjab Province of Pakistan. It is part of  Talagang Tehsil.

References

Chakwal District